Flatliners is a 2017 American science fiction psychological horror drama film directed by Niels Arden Oplev and written by Ben Ripley. A stand-alone sequel to and remake of the 1990 film of the same name, it stars Elliot Page, Diego Luna, Nina Dobrev, James Norton, and Kiersey Clemons. The story follows five medical students who attempt to conduct experiments that produce near-death experiences.

Sony Pictures released the film in the United States on September 29, 2017. It was negatively reviewed by critics, who generally remarked that it repeated the problems of the original in failing to do justice to its interesting premise, but it was a moderate box office success, grossing $45.2 million worldwide on a $19 million budget.

Plot

Courtney is a medical student who is obsessed with the idea of the afterlife. She invites her classmates, Jamie and Sophia, to join her in an experiment, in an unused hospital room: using defibrillation to stop her heart for sixty seconds while recording her brain. She assures them they would not be held responsible for any accidents. Sophia is against this, but Jamie does it anyway. After sixty seconds, they are unable to revive her until a fellow student, Ray, steps in to help. Marlo, Ray's rival, arrives and learns of the experiment.

Courtney begins to recall memories of past events and experiences increased intelligence and euphoria. Envious, Jamie flatlines, but has a disturbing near-death experience as he meets his ex-girlfriend. Marlo and Sophia follow suit, increasing the duration of time they are down. During Sophia’s turn they are nearly caught and flee the hospital. 

Those who flatlined experience visions: Courtney sees her sister Tessa, who died in a car crash Courtney caused, Jamie sees the baby he begged his ex-girlfriend to abort, Marlo sees a patient named Cyrus, who died when she accidentally mixed up his medication, and Sophia sees Irina, whose life she ruined out of jealousy, allowing Sophia to become valedictorian. Everyone keeps their visions a secret from each other.

Courtney, traumatized by her visions, records a message apologizing and admitting that her interest in flatlining was due to the death of her sister, not for scientific discovery. She falls to her death from the fire escape of her apartment building after her sister's ghost pushes her. The others are devastated but realize they may be implicated if anyone discovers their experiments. After attempting to remove all evidence from Courtney’s apartment, Marlo goes to the morgue to find Courtney’s phone, where she's disturbed by more visions. 

On his boat, Jamie again hears the cries of a baby and a woman weeping. He falls out of his boat and swims to the dock where a figure stabs him in his hand.

The group watches Courtney's recording and find out that she had similar visions to their own. They admit the mistakes they made and come to the conclusion that the hauntings they're experiencing are hallucinations because of guilt from their sins, not paranormal beings. The only one who did not flatline, Ray, initially disbelieves what is happening.

Sophia visits Irina to apologize, which Irina accepts. Jamie visits his ex-girlfriend and discovers she kept the baby; he apologizes and promises to provide for his son. Ray and Marlo get into a fight when Ray finds out Marlo covered up the real reason Cyrus died and she refuses to confess. Marlo hallucinates being suffocated while driving and crashes her car. Tired of being haunted by her hallucinations, Marlo flatlines on her own in the hope of asking Cyrus for forgiveness. She sees Courtney, who tells Marlo that she needs to forgive herself. Ray, Sophia and Jamie arrive to resuscitate Marlo. 

Marlo confesses to the Dean and is held on probation. Marlo, Ray, Sophia and Jamie meet to reminisce about Courtney.

Cast

Production
In October 2015, Elliot Page was cast in the film. In February 2016, Diego Luna was added, with Nina Dobrev joining in April. In May 2016, Kiersey Clemons and James Norton signed on for the film.

In July 2016, it was announced that Kiefer Sutherland, who starred in the original, would return in the new film. Sutherland later disclosed that he was reprising his role from the original film, adding that the new film is actually a sequel rather than a remake. Despite the announcement, Sutherland played a character with a different name than in the original, with no reference to the specific events of the previous film. In July 2016, Charlotte McKinney also joined the cast.

Principal photography began in early July 2016 in Toronto, Ontario primarily at Cinespace Film Studios' Kipling Avenue facility, and concluded on September 7. The film went into post-production on October 4.

Nathan Barr composed the film score. The soundtrack was released by Sony Classical.

Release

Box office
Flatliners grossed $16.9 million in the United States and Canada, and $28.1 million in other territories, for a worldwide total of $45.2 million, against a production budget of $19 million.

In North America, the film was released alongside American Made and 'Til Death Do Us Part, as well as the wide expansion of Battle of the Sexes, and was projected to gross $8–12 million from 2,552 theaters in its opening weekend. It ended up debuting to $6.6 million, finishing 5th at the box office; even before factoring in inflation, the number was lower than the $10 million opening of the original film in 1990. In its second weekend the film dropped 42%, grossing $3.6 million.

Critical response
On review aggregation website Rotten Tomatoes, the film has an approval rating of 4% based on 79 reviews and an average rating of 3.6/10. The site's critical consensus reads, "Flatliners falls flat as a horror movie and fails to improve upon its source material, rendering this reboot dead on arrival." On Metacritic, which assigns a normalized rating to reviews, the film has a weighted average score of 27 out of 100 based 20 critics, indicating "generally unfavorable reviews". Audiences polled by CinemaScore gave the film an average grade of "B−" on an A+ to F scale, while PostTrak reported filmgoers gave it a 66% overall positive score and a 46% "definite recommend".

Criticizing the repetitiveness of the scenes and lack of tension, Peter Travers of Rolling Stone called the film "even more witless and stupefyingly dull than the original." He gave it one star. Ryan Porter gave it one-and-a-half stars in The Star, saying that like the original, it takes a solid premise and fails to develop it in an interesting or exciting way. He said the film's one positive is the unintentional humor which results from the stupidity of several scenes and the earnestness with which the actors approach them. Matt Zoller Seitz similarly said that "[the] premise [of the original Flatliners], which could have opened the door to a visionary work of sci-fi horror, settled into a sort of gothic self-help drama groove, with the medical students realizing that the seemingly supernatural goings-on triggered by their experiments in 'flatlining' were manifestations of their past misdeeds. Director Niels Arden Oplev's remake ... sticks to that template, changing key details here and there while embracing a style that stirs every current horror movie visual cliche into a jagged paste." He also remarked that the obvious effort given by the entire cast could not overcome the contrived and clichéd scares and melodrama. Both Travers and Porter derided the visual effect of the afterlife scenes as cheap-looking and silly.

Home media
Flatliners was released on Digital HD on December 12, 2017, and on Blu-ray and DVD on December 19, 2017 in Canada, and on December 26, 2017 in the United States.

See also
 A Thousand Deaths

Notes

References

External links
 
 
 
 

2017 films
2017 horror films
2010s psychological drama films
2010s science fiction drama films
2010s science fiction horror films
2010s psychological horror films
2017 psychological thriller films
2010s supernatural horror films
American sequel films
American psychological drama films
American psychological horror films
American psychological thriller films
American science fiction drama films
American science fiction horror films
American science fiction thriller films
American supernatural horror films
American supernatural thriller films
Columbia Pictures films
Cross Creek Pictures films
Films about death
Films directed by Niels Arden Oplev
Films set in 2008
Films set in 2017
Films produced by Laurence Mark
Films produced by Michael Douglas
Films scored by Nathan Barr
Films shot in Toronto
Horror film remakes
Science fiction film remakes
Thriller film remakes
Medical-themed films
Fiction about near-death experiences
2017 drama films
2010s English-language films
2010s American films